Morus mesozygia, known as black mulberry or African mulberry, is a small- to medium-sized forest tree of Tropical Africa. Its leaves and fruit provide food for the mantled guereza, a colobus monkey native to much of Tropical Africa, and for the common chimpanzee of West and Central Africa. It is also a commercial hardwood.

The trees can be found in Ngogo in Kibale National Park in Uganda, where they are a food source for chimpanzees.

References

External links

Flora of West Tropical Africa
Fruits originating in Africa
Trees of Africa
mesozygia